Horní Stropnice (until 1950 Stropnice) is a municipality and village in České Budějovice District in the South Bohemian Region of the Czech Republic. It has about 1,500 inhabitants.

Administrative parts
Villages and hamlets of Bedřichov, Chlupatá Ves, Dlouhá Stropnice, Dobrá Voda, Hlinov, Hojná Voda, Humenice, Konratice, Krčín, Meziluží, Olbramov, Paseky, Rychnov u Nových Hradů, Šejby, Staré Hutě, Střeziměřice, Svébohy, Světví, Vesce and Vyhlídky are administrative parts of Horní Stropnice.

History
The first written mention of Horní Stropnice is from 1185. The village has been a sole property of the aristocratic Rosenberg family throughout the history.

Sights
The Church of Saint Nicholas is as old as the village and has preserved its Romanesque look.

Notable people
Wenzel Jaksch (1896–1966), German politician
František Binder (1914–1942), war hero

References

Villages in České Budějovice District